The 1886 Ontario general election was the sixth general election held in the Province of Ontario, Canada. It was held on December 28, 1886, to elect the 90 Members of the 6th Legislative Assembly of Ontario ("MLAs"). The election results were characterized a "crushing defeat for the Conservatives.

The Ontario Liberal Party, led by Oliver Mowat, won a fifth consecutive term in government and an increased majority in the Legislature.

The Ontario Conservative Party, led by William Ralph Meredith lost five of its seats.

In Toronto, this and the next election (1890) were held under the Limited Vote system wherein Toronto voters had two votes for the three MPPs in their district. This allowed a degree of minority representation.

Redistribution of ridings
The Assembly was increased from 88 to 90 members, through the following changes:

Results

|-
! colspan=2 rowspan=2 | Political party
! rowspan=2 | Party leader
! colspan=5 | MPPs
! colspan=3 | Votes
|-
! Candidates
!1883
!Dissol.
!1886
!±
!#
!%
! ± (pp)

|style="text-align:left;"|Oliver Mowat
|88
|48
|
|57
|9
|153,282
|48.41%
|0.21

|style="text-align:left;"|William Ralph Meredith
|83
|37
|
|32
|5
|148,969
|47.05%
|0.46

|style="text-align:left;"|
|5
|1
|
|1
|
|2,145
|0.68%
|0.85

|style="text-align:left;"|
|
|2
|
|–
|2
|colspan="3"|Did not campaign

|style="text-align:left;"|
|5
|–
|–
|–
|
|12,196
|3.85%
|2.32

|style="text-align:left;"|
|1
|–
|–
|–
|
|14
|–
|

|style="text-align:left;"|
|
|–
|–
|–
|
|colspan="3"|Did not campaign

|colspan="3"|
|
|colspan="5"|
|-style="background:#E9E9E9;"
|colspan="3" style="text-align:left;"|Total
|182
|88
|88
|90
|
|316,606
|100.00%
|
|-
|colspan="8" style="text-align:left;"|Blank and invalid ballots
|align="right"|3,622
|style="background:#E9E9E9;" colspan="2"|
|-style="background:#E9E9E9;"
|colspan="8" style="text-align:left;"|Registered voters / turnout
|459,495
|69.69%
|6.23
|}

See also
Politics of Ontario
List of Ontario political parties
Premier of Ontario
Leader of the Opposition (Ontario)

References

1886
1886 elections in Canada
1886 in Ontario
December 1886 events